The Massachusetts general election, 2012 was held on November 6, 2012, throughout Massachusetts. Primary elections took place on September 6, 2012.

Federal

United States Senate

United States House of Representatives

Ballot measures
There were three statewide ballot questions, all initiatives.

Source:

References

External links
 
Elections Division of the Massachusetts Secretary of State
Massachusetts at Ballotpedia
Massachusetts judicial elections, 2012 at Judgepedia
Massachusetts 2012 campaign finance data from OpenSecrets
Massachusetts Congressional Races in 2012 campaign finance data from OpenSecrets
Outside spending at the Sunlight Foundation
Local politics at The Boston Herald

 
Massachusetts